The Two Centenaries is a political slogan that refers to two 100-year anniversaries and a stated set of economic and political goals advanced by General Secretary Xi Jinping following the 18th National Congress of the Chinese Communist Party (CCP) held in 2012. The Chinese government describes the Two Centenaries as the basic foundation for achieving the "Chinese Dream".

Background 
The "centenaries" refer to two 100-year anniversaries: 
 The centenary of the founding of the CCP in 1921. According to official CCP discourse, a Xiaokang society will have been achieved at the conclusion of this centenary. While "Xiaokang" – roughly meaning "moderately well-off" – is an abstract theory rooted in Confucianism and socialist ideology, the party has outlined it in terms of doubling of the 2010 per capita income figures.
 The centenary of the founding of the People's Republic of China in 2049, at which point, China will have become a "strong, democratic, civilized, harmonious, and modern socialist country" according to the People's Daily.

History of the slogan
The concept was first articulated at the 15th Party Congress held in 1997 during the term of then General Secretary Jiang Zemin. Apart from occasional pronouncements in party publications, this concept was not widely discussed again until Xi assumed the party leadership in 2012. Since then, it has become a major part of party slogans, recited in news reports, at conferences, and training sessions for party officials. 

According to academic Ding Lu, the "so-called Two Centenary Goals underwrite all China’s long-term economic planning programs and contemporary macroeconomic policy agendas."

Celebratory events

100th Anniversary of the Chinese Communist Party (2021) 

A ceremony which marked the 100th anniversary of the founding of the CCP, or the Centennial of the Chinese Communist Party (Chinese: 中国共产党成立一百周年), took place on 1 July 2021. CCP general secretary Xi Jinping delivered a speech in which he specifically announced the realization of the first goal of the Two Centenaries.

"The Great Journey," an art performance, was also held in prior in the Beijing National Stadium to mark the 100th anniversary of the founding of the Chinese Communist Party on 28 June. It was later broadcast by China Media Group on the evening of 1 July 2021.

100th anniversary of the People's Republic of China (2049) 

The 100th anniversary of the founding of the People's Republic of China, or the Centennial of the People's Republic of China (Chinese: 中华人民共和国成立一百周年) is expected to fall on 1 October 2049, the National Day of the People's Republic of China.

Responses 
A columnist for The Diplomat suggested that Xi's emphasis on these goals gives objective evaluation criteria for the performance of the CCP and that achieving these goals will be a major test to the legitimacy of CCP rule in the country.

See also 

 Ideology of the Chinese Communist Party

References

2012 in China
2021 in China
Anniversaries
Regional centennial anniversaries
Ideology of the Chinese Communist Party
People's Republic of China
Xi Jinping